

See also
 List of sculptures of presidents of the United States
 Mount Rushmore
 Presidential memorials in the United States

Lincoln, Abraham